So Fresh: The Hits Of Spring 2001 is a compilation album which features some of the most popular songs in 2001 in Australia.

Track listing
 S Club 7 – "Don't Stop Movin'" (3:53)
 Lifehouse – "Hanging by a Moment" (3:36)
 Train – "Drops of Jupiter (Tell Me)" (4:20)
 The Supermen Lovers – "Starlight" (3:50)
 Destiny's Child – "Bootylicious" (3:29)
 Jagged Edge featuring Run–D.M.C. – "Let's Get Married" (4:10)
 D12 – "Purple Pills" (4:24)
 Nelly featuring City Spud – "Ride wit Me" (4:16)
 Creed – "With Arms Wide Open" (3:44)
 Toploader – "Dancing in the Moonlight" (3:51)
 Westlife – "Uptown Girl" (3:07)
 Mandy Moore – "In My Pocket" (3:41)
 Jennifer Lopez – "Play" (3:18)
 Sirens featuring The Big Brother Housemates – "The Housemates Song (Don't You Think That It's Strange?)" (3:39)
 Joanne – "So Damn Fine" (3:37)
 Roger Sanchez – "Another Chance" (3:16)
 Fatboy Slim – "Weapon of Choice" (5:38)
 Something for Kate – "Monsters" (3:39)
 Dido – "Here with Me" (4:06)
 Blink-182 – "The Rock Show" (2:50)

Charts

References

So Fresh albums
2001 compilation albums
2001 in Australian music